The Armenian Young Men's Society refers to the Armenian Scouting and sport organizations Hoyetchmen and Armenagan in Jerusalem, both connected to the Armenian Democratic Liberal Party (Ramgavar Party). The organizations are remnants of earlier political movements that merged, including the Armenian communist and socialist parties (Hentchag party).Hoyetchmen has been known for its advocation of cultural themes, including theater, photography and handmade crafts.

Emblems 

Scouting and Guiding in Armenia